Living Proof is Buddy Guy's 15th studio album. After nearly fifty years in the music business, this was Guy's highest charting album ever (until the release of Rhythm & Blues in 2013), peaking at no. 46 on the main Billboard album chart. It won the 2011 Grammy for Best Contemporary Blues Album.

The album loosely follows the progression of Guy's life. "Living Proof was designed partially as an aural autobiography from the legendary Buddy Guy, opening up with the stark summation “74 Years Young,” then running through songs that often address some aspect of a working musician's life."

Musicians
 Buddy Guy – guitars, vocals
 David Grissom – guitar
 Tommy Macdonald – bass guitar (tr. 5, 6) Michael Rhodes - bass guitar
 Tom Hambridge – drums, percussion, tambourine, backing vocals
 Marty Sammon – piano (tr. 10)
 Reese Wynans – clavinet,  Fender Rhodes, Hammond B3, piano, Wurlitzer - Electric Piano
 B.B. King – guitar and vocals on "Stay Around a Little Longer"
 Carlos Santana – conga and guitar on "Where the Blues Begins"

 The Memphis Horns – horns (tr. 3) are
 Wayne Jackson – trumpet
 Tom McGinley – tenor saxophone 
 Jack Hale – trombone
 Bekka Bramlett, Wendy Moten – backing vocals

Personnel
 Tom Hambridge - producer
 Vance Powell, John Netti, Jim Reitzel, Rob Root, Colin Linden, Michael St. Leon – engineers
 Ducky Carlisle – mixing engineer
 Nick Autry – assistant engineer, production assistant
 Mike Rooney, Joel Margolis – assistant engineers
 Gilbert Garza – guitar technician
 Ray Kennedy – mastering

Track listing

Charts

References

2010 albums
Buddy Guy albums
Jive Records albums
Grammy Award for Best Contemporary Blues Album
Albums produced by Tom Hambridge